Jules Archoska (March 13, 1905 – March 18, 1972) was an American football end who played one season with the Staten Island Stapletons of the National Football League. He played college football at Syracuse University and attended Lynn Classical High School in Lynn, Massachusetts.

References

External links
Just Sports Stats

1905 births
1972 deaths
Players of American football from Massachusetts
American football ends
Syracuse Orange football players
Staten Island Stapletons players
Sportspeople from Lynn, Massachusetts